Alex Lu is the Global Head and General Manager for Rlg Communications, based in Dubai, responsible for the global operations and business development for the company.

Prior to joining Rlg, he was the Senior Director of BYD Electronic (BYD). Lu led BYD to Dell, Kodak and Compal (HP) supply chains.

Lu, as head of Energy Storage Systems for BYD, signed a cooperation agreement with Eurosol to develop green energy industry.

References

Ghanaian businesspeople
Ghanaian people of Chinese descent
Year of birth missing (living people)
Living people